The Save Manapouri campaign was an environmental campaign waged between 1969 and 1972 in New Zealand to prevent the raising of the levels of lakes Manapouri and Te Anau as part of the construction of the Manapouri Power Project.

Origins

The original plans for Manapouri Power Station development involved raising Lake Manapouri by up to 30 metres, and merging Lakes Manapouri and Te Anau. The Save Manapouri Campaign was launched at a public meeting at Invercargill in October 1969. It later came to manifest the international awareness of the environment that came with the prosperity of the 1960s.

"At its simplest, the issue was about whether Lake Manapouri should be raised by as much as 30 metres. But there was much more at stake than that. There were strong economic and engineering arguments opposing lake raising, and there were also legal and democratic issues underlying the whole debate. What captured the public's imagination across the country was the prospect that a lake as beautiful as Manapouri could be interfered with, despoiled and debased", wrote Neville Peat.

In 1970, 264,907 New Zealanders, almost 10% of the population, signed the Save Manapouri petition. Nevertheless, the Cabinet Committee on Manapouri and the Manapouri Commission of Inquiry both concluded that the New Zealand Government was obligated under the terms of the Manapouri-Te Anau Development Act 1963 to raise the levels of Lakes Manapouri and Te Anau in order to guarantee the supply to Comalco (now Rio Tinto Aluminium) of electricity for the aluminium smelter based at Tiwai Point.

Impacts

In the 1972 general election, Manapouri was a significant issue, and the Labour Government of Norman Kirk was elected on a platform that included a strong endorsement of the Save Manapouri ideals.

In 1973, Kirk honoured his party's election pledge. He created an independent body, the Guardians of Lake Manapouri, Monowai, and Te Anau to oversee management of the lake levels, which they do to this day. The original six Guardians were Alan Mark, Ronald McLean, Wilson Campbell, Les Hutchins, John Moore, and Jim McFarlane, and they were all prominent leaders of the Save Manapouri Campaign.

The single Damn the Dam recorded and released in 1973 by John Hanlon has retrospectively become associated with the Save Manapouri Campaign. Hanlon's song was originally an energy conservation jingle to advertise home insulation, with the proceeds from its release going to charities. However, since the release of this song followed on from the successful conclusion of the Save Manapouri Campaign, 'Damn the Dam' is now popularly recognised as an anthem in tribute to one of New Zealand's longest and hardest-fought environmental campaigns.

In 1991, the Save Manapouri Campaign was revived with many of the same leaders and renamed Power For Our Future. The campaign opposed selling off the power station, to ensure that Comalco did not revive its plans to raise Lake Manapouri's waters. The campaign was successful: the government announced that Manapouri would not be sold to Comalco.

References

Further reading

External links
 Damn the Dam performed by John Hanlon

Environmental issues in New Zealand
Hydroelectricity in New Zealand
Environmental protests in New Zealand
History of Southland, New Zealand
Fiordland
1959 in the environment